The Ökologisch-Botanischer Garten der Universität Bayreuth (16 hectares) is a botanical garden maintained by the University of Bayreuth. It is located at Universitätsstraße 30, Bayreuth, Bavaria, Germany, and open daily except Saturday.

The garden was founded in 1978 with a focus on ecology and environmental field research and teaching. It now contains over 10,000 plant species from around the world, organized into four major sections:

 Crop garden (1 hectare)
 Ecology experimental plots (8 hectares) with lysimeter and groundwater basins.
 Greenhouses (about 8000 m² total) containing woodland and grass plants, aquarium plants, succulents, and plants of tropical mountains and cloud forests.
 Geographic sections - plants from the Americas, Asia, and Europe.

The university also maintains a herbarium, established in 2001, which contains approximately 25,000 documents focusing on seed plants, but also with several thousand cryptogams, especially mosses, as well as a seed collection and library.

See also 
 List of botanical gardens in Germany

External links 

 Ökologisch-Botanischer Garten der Universität Bayreuth
 Garden map
 Institut für Afrikastudien, Ökologisch-Botanischer Garten 
 Hermann von Helmholtz-Zentrum entry
 Bayreuth description

Botanical gardens in Germany
Gardens in Bavaria